John Brooks (23 December 1931 – 7 June 2016) was an English professional footballer and manager who played for Reading, Tottenham Hotspur, Chelsea, Brentford, Crystal Palace in the Football League. Brooks won three England caps and scored two goals. Towards the end of his career he played in non-League football with Stevenage Town and Cambridge City and in North America with Cleveland Stokers. He later player-managed Knebworth. His son Shaun Brooks also had a career in professional football.

Playing career

Reading
Brooks' career began as a youth at Coley Old Boys, Mount Pleasant, Castle Street Institute and he also represented Reading & Berkshire schoolboys. An inside forward, he began his senior club career at hometown Third Division South club Reading. Brooks joined the Royals in February 1949 as an amateur and signed a professional contract two months later. While with Reading, Brooks served his national service at Aldershot and represented the Army football team. He made 46 league appearances and scored five goals over the course of a three-year spell and helped the club to third and second-place finishes in the 1950–51 and 1951–52 seasons respectively. Brooks departed Elm Park in February 1953 and was posthumously inducted into the Reading Hall of Fame in 2018.

Tottenham Hotspur

After turning down moves to Newcastle United, Arsenal and West Ham United, Brooks joined First Division club Tottenham Hotspur in February 1953 for a £6,000 fee, with Dennis Uphill and Harry Robshaw moving to Reading. He later recalled that Tottenham had always been in his blood, after watching the 1949–50 Second Division and 1950–51 First Division championship triumphs on the terraces at White Hart Lane. After beginning his career with the club in the reserve team, Brooks made his first team debut in a 2–0 defeat to Stoke City on 6 April 1953, but it would prove to be his only appearance of the 1952–53 season.

By the 1954–55 season, Brooks had broken through into the first team and made 31 appearances, scoring seven goals. After the departure of manager Arthur Rowe in 1955, the best years of Brooks' Spurs career came under new manager Jimmy Anderson and he scored in double figures to help Tottenham to second and third-place finishes in the 1956–57 and 1957–58 seasons respectively. His performances also won him England recognition. A bust up with new manager Bill Nicholson after a 6–0 defeat to Wolverhampton Wanderers in 1958 was the beginning of the end of Brooks' time at White Hart Lane and he departed the club in December 1959. Brooks scored 51 goals in 179 appearances during his six and a half years with Tottenham.

Chelsea
Brooks joined First Division club Chelsea for a £20,000 fee in December 1959, with Les Allen moving to Tottenham Hotspur in exchange. The move reunited Brooks with his former Reading manager Ted Drake. He made 52 appearances and scored seven goals over the course of a spell which lasted until September 1961.

Brentford
Brooks signed for Chelsea's West London neighbours Brentford in September 1961 in a £5,000 deal. He made 38 league appearances and scored 10 goals over the course of a disastrous 1961–62 season in the Third Division, with a 23rd-place finish relegating the Bees to the Fourth Division for the 1962–63 season. In the Fourth Division, Brooks was the playmaker and inspired Brentford to the title, making 39 appearances, scoring 22 goals and winning the first club silverware of his career. He missed the final few games of the season after suffering a torn groin and his fitness troubles continued into the 1963–64 season, in which he scored four goals in six games before leaving the club. Brooks made 92 appearances and scored over 40 goals during his time at Griffin Park. Looking back in 2005, Brooks revealed "in many ways the two years I spent at Brentford were my happiest in the game".

Crystal Palace
Brooks joined Third Division club Crystal Palace in January 1964. He made just seven appearances for the club before departing at the end of the 1963–64 season, after the club's promotion to the Second Division was confirmed.

Toronto City
Brooks spurned the interest of Lincoln City and Aldershot and travelled to Canada in May 1964, to sign for Eastern Canada Professional Soccer League club Toronto City. Among his teammates at the club were Tony Book, Ted Purdon, Norman Sykes and player-manager Malcolm Allison.

Non-League football
Brooks returned to the UK in September 1964 and signed for Southern League club Stevenage Town, managed by George Curtis. He later moved within the league to join Cambridge City.

Cleveland Stokers
Brooks returned to North America to play in the North American Soccer League with Cleveland Stokers in 1968. He made 22 appearances and scored one goal in his spell.

Return to non-League football
After his return to the UK, Brooks played for and managed Herts Senior County League club Knebworth well into his fifties. He later coached the teams at Moordown Youth and served as president of Bournemouth.

International career
Brooks' goalscoring for Tottenham Hotspur won him a call up to the England squad for a British Home Championship match versus Wales on 14 November 1956. He scored the second goal in a 3–1 victory. He was called up again for a friendly versus Yugoslavia two weeks later and again got on the scoresheet in a 3–0 win. Brooks' third and final cap came in a 5–2 1958 World Cup qualification win over Denmark on 5 December 1956.

Personal life
Brooks was one of the earliest British footballers to endorse hair products, advertising Max Factor shampoo during the 1950s. Brooks' son Shaun was also a professional footballer and played for Leyton Orient, Crystal Palace, Bournemouth, was capped by England at schoolboy and youth level and managed Dorchester Town. After retiring from football, Brooks worked alongside friend and former teammate Tommy Harmer as a broker's messenger for Bank Hapoalim, until being made redundant at the age of 60. With the help of former teammate Micky Dulin, Brooks then became a park-keeper at Ridgeway Park in Chingford. Brooks retired and moved to Bournemouth in 1997. It was reported in 2014 that Brooks was suffering with vascular dementia and he died on 7 June 2016.

Honours
England
 British Home Championship: 1956–57

Brentford

Football League Fourth Division: 1962–63

Crystal Palace

 Football League Third Division second-place promotion: 1963–64
Individual

 Reading Hall of Fame

Career statistics

References

External links

 Fact file
 England international career
 Johnny Brooks interview
 Tottenham Hotspur F.C A-Z of players

1931 births
2016 deaths
Military personnel from Reading, Berkshire
20th-century British Army personnel
British Army soldiers
England international footballers
Sportspeople from Reading, Berkshire
Reading F.C. players
Tottenham Hotspur F.C. players
Chelsea F.C. players
Brentford F.C. players
Crystal Palace F.C. players
English Football League players
English footballers
Southern Football League players
Toronto City players
Eastern Canada Professional Soccer League players
Cambridge City F.C. players
North American Soccer League (1968–1984) players
Cleveland Stokers players
Knebworth F.C. players
Knebworth F.C. managers
Stevenage Town F.C. players
Association football inside forwards
English expatriate sportspeople in the United States
Expatriate soccer players in the United States
English expatriate footballers
English expatriate sportspeople in Canada
Expatriate soccer players in Canada
English football managers
Footballers from Berkshire
Deaths from dementia in England
Deaths from vascular dementia